The Harold Formation is a geologic formation in the Central Mojave Desert, west of Victorville and north of the San Gabriel Mountains, in eastern San Bernardino County, Southern California.

Geology
The formation, with Shoemaker Gravel in other areas, overlies the Pliocene epoch Crowder Formation.

The Harold Formation preserves Cenozoic Era fossils.

See also

  
 List of fossiliferous stratigraphic units in California
 Paleontology in California

References

Cenozoic California
Geology of San Bernardino County, California
Natural history of the Mojave Desert
Geologic formations of California